Parornix conspicuella is a moth of the family Gracillariidae. It is known from Québec, Canada, and Pennsylvania, Maine, Michigan and Vermont in the United States.

The larvae feed on Betula nigra. They mine the leaves of their host plant.

References

Parornix
Moths of North America
Moths described in 1907